Nándor Hargitai also known as Nándor Szirmai (20 October 1919 – 11 September 2006) was a Hungarian football midfielder.

Career
Born in Mátraszele, he begin his career at the youth team of Dorogi FC. He debuted at age 17 for Dorogi senior team in the 1936–37 season but a year later he was signing with Ferencvárosi TC. He made only one appearance for Ferencváros in the 1937–38 season when they won the Hungarian championship. While playing with Ferencváros he changed his name to Nándor Szirmai. In the 1938–39 season, he joined another Hungarian top-flight club, Phöbus FC. In 1940 he moved to Yugoslav club NAK Novi Sad. However after only one season, and with Second World War on their way, the city of Novi Sad was occupied by Hungarian forces, and NAK begin to be known as Újvideki AC and play in the Hungarian championship. After the war he played with Hungarian side Viscosa SE until 1949 when he returned to Dorogi FC, now known as Dorogi Bányász and had just returned to top-flight, and played there until 1955 making a total of 131 league appearances and scoring once. He reached the 1953 Hungarian Cup final.

He died on 11 September 2006, in Esztergom, Hungary.

Honours
Ferencváros
Hungarian championship: 1937–38

Dorogi Bányász
Hungarian Cup finalist: 1952

References

1919 births
2006 deaths
Hungarian footballers
Association football midfielders
Dorogi FC footballers
Ferencvárosi TC footballers
NAK Novi Sad players
Expatriate footballers in Yugoslavia
Hungarian expatriate sportspeople in Yugoslavia